Sad Boy may refer to:

 "Sad Boy" (song), a song by Jonas Blue, R3hab, Ava Max and Kylie Cantrall
 "Sad Boy" (G-Eazy song), a song by G-Eazy from When It's Dark Out
 "Sad Boy", a song by Stevie Wonder from Stevie at the Beach
Sad Boy, a book by Michael C. Keith

See also 
 "Sadboy"